White Rabbit Creamy Candy is a brand of milk candy manufactured by Shanghai Guan Sheng Yuan Food, Ltd., in China.  It is an iconic cultural brand and has been in production since 1943.

Ingredients and varieties 
White Rabbit candies are a milk-based white candy with a soft, chewy texture, sold as small, rectangular candies approximately  similar to taffy.  

Each candy is wrapped in a printed waxed paper wrapper, with the candies again wrapped within this in a thin edible paper-like wrapping made from sticky rice. The rice wrapping layer is meant to be eaten along with the rest of the candy and can be found in the list of ingredients in the UK as "Edible Glutinous Rice Paper (edible starch, water, Glycerin Monostearate)" along with liquid maltose, white granulated sugar, whole milk powder, butter, food additives (gelatin, vanillin), corn starch, syrup, cane sugar and milk. Each candy contains 20 calories.

In addition to the original vanilla flavour, new flavours such as chocolate, coffee, toffee, peanut, maize, coconut, lychee, strawberry, mango, red bean, yogurt, matcha, and fruit have been added. The butter-plum flavour, characteristic of China, was also among the new flavours added through the years.

Brand history 
White Rabbit candy originated in the ABC Candy Factory of Shanghai in 1943, when a merchant from ABC tried a milk candy from England and was impressed by its taste. After half a year of development, he then manufactured the factory's own brand of milk candies.

The first ABC milk candies were packaged using a red Mickey Mouse drawing on the label, and were named ABC Mickey Mouse Sweets. As their prices were lower than imported products, they became widely popular among the people.

In the 1950s, ABC became state-owned during the Cultural Revolution. Mickey Mouse was seen as a symbol of foreign countries, and so the packaging was redesigned to feature a naturalistically drawn white rabbit and an artist's paint palette, with Chinese and English hand-lettering in a color scheme of red, blue and black against a white background. The result was a distinctive candy label design. The packaging and brand logo have changed over the years: when the candies were first marketed, the white rabbit on the outer packaging was lying down; however, this was changed to an image of the rabbit jumping. Currently, the trade mark animal on the outer packaging has been given enormous neotenic, forward-facing eyes in the style of  Disney or Japanese anime, while the inner wrapping retains its classic art deco look and naturalistic rabbit.

In 1959, these candies were given as gifts for the 10th National Day of China. In 1972, Premier Zhou Enlai used White Rabbit candies as a gift to American president, Richard Nixon, when he visited China. Today, White Rabbit candies are China's top brand of sweet.

White Rabbit sweets have been advertised with the slogan "Seven White Rabbit candies is equivalent to one cup of milk" and positioned as a nutritional product in addition to being a sweet, and experienced popularity amongst former students of the early Deng Xiaoping era in China (1978 to the early 1990s), who were reported to have taken this slogan literally and made 'hot milk' in their dormitory cooking rings by dissolving the candies in a pan of hot water.

Although the White Rabbit brand already had some history, its popularity worldwide has grown with the economy of China. Cities and agricultural villages' demands are increasing, especially during the Chinese New Year period, when many families provide White Rabbit sweets among other candies for visitors. In 2004, White Rabbit candy sales hit 600 million yuan, with sales increasing by a double-digit percentage yearly. The candies are now exported to more than 40 countries and territories, including the United States, Europe and Singapore. On December 2 2017, Wong's Ice Cream of Toronto, Canada unveiled the first ice cream flavour made from White Rabbit candy.

The White Rabbit brand was transferred to Guan Sheng Yuan (Group) Co., Ltd. in November 1997. The United States distributor of the candy is Queensway Foods, in Millbrae, California.

Product recalls

Formaldehyde contamination
In July 2007, the Philippine Bureau of Food and Drugs (BFAD) said that four imported foods made in China contained formalin and should be recalled. Those listed were White Rabbit Creamy Candy, Milk Candy, Balron Grape Biscuits, and Yong Kang Foods Grape Biscuits. The White Rabbit brand claimed that counterfeit candies, known to exist in the Philippines, may have been the cause of the contaminated sweets, citing an independent report by the Shanghai affiliate of the Swiss-based SGS Group, the world's largest inspection and testing company, as saying that samples of candy ready to be exported overseas contained no toxic substances. In Singapore, the Agri-Food and Veterinary Authority (AVA) also stated after conducting tests that the candy was safe for consumption. However, on July 24, 2007, the local Philippine distributor of White Rabbit bowed to the BFAD recall order. BFAD officials gave the distributor 15 days to implement the recall.

On July 24 2007, the National Agency of Drug and Food Control of Republic of Indonesia stated that 39 imported foods made in China, including White Rabbit Creamy Candy sold in Jakarta, contained formaldehyde, and sealed them for destruction. It urged the public not to consume these products. On August 9 2007, Indonesia stated that samples of White Rabbit candy sold in Palembang and Mataram also contained formaldehyde, and took similar actions.

Melamine contamination

In September 2008, there were more than 52,000 reported cases of children made sick by melamine-tainted dairy products in China. Most of the children were diagnosed with kidney problems. White Rabbit Creamy Candy was listed among the many milk-based food products made in China that were contaminated with melamine and was removed from store shelves. The same form of contamination was responsible for the Chinese melamine pet food contamination scandal in 2007, during which thousands of pet dogs and cats died of kidney failure after eating pet food that contained melamine.

On September 24 2008, the UK supermarket chain Tesco pulled all White Rabbit Candy from their shelves "as a precaution" in response to the melamine-contamination reports. The Hong Kong Centre for Food Safety issued an advisory on the product after it tested positive for melamine in their laboratories, with more than six times the legal limit for the chemical.
 Australia issued a recall. The Agri-Food and Veterinary Authority of Singapore issued a similar advisory, while also noting that although the level of melamine was high in the candy, it did not pose the same sort of danger that the contaminated infant formula did. 

White Rabbit candies exported to New Zealand were also tested, and though melamine was found, as there had been no harm done yet they were unable to recall. Two reporters, using the Singaporean test results, calculated that "a 60kg adult [...] would have to eat more than 47 White Rabbit sweets [...] every day over a lifetime to exceed the tolerable threshold" for melamine. In September 2008, the Connecticut Department of Consumer Protection warned consumers not to eat "White Rabbit Creamy Candy" because tests by the Connecticut Agriculture Experiment Station Laboratory determined that it contained melamine. In September 2008, United States Food and Drug Administration warned consumers about White Rabbit candy over concerns of possible melamine contamination, and the American distributor, Queensway Foods Inc., ordered a recall. Tests conducted in South Africa confirmed similar results.

Golden Rabbit
When White Rabbit candy returned to export in 2009, it also underwent a name change to Golden Rabbit Creamy Candy. Aside from avoiding the marketing stigma associated with the tarnished White Rabbit name, the Golden Rabbit candy is made using milk from Australia instead of China.  Original White Rabbit is also manufactured with milk from New Zealand.

See also
 Orange jelly candy
 Dragon's beard candy
 Deuk Deuk Tong
 Krówki
 Botan Rice Candy

References

External links 
 有容「奶」大 11 February 2004 Chinese Merchants' Press 
 大白兔的“大动作 
 Official site for Guan Sheng Yuan Food, Ltd.
 Queensway Foods Official Website
 http://brandchannel.com/features_profile.asp?pr_id=418 

Chinese brands
Chinese confectionery
Brand name confectionery
2008 Chinese milk scandal
Products introduced in 1943